Kabati is a small town in Kenya's Central Province, between Thika and Makuyu.

Namesake 

There is another town in Kitui County of this name.

See also 
 Railway stations in Kenya
 Ruiru
 Gichuru

References 

Populated places in Central Province (Kenya)